Elections to Rochford Council were held on 1 May 2008. One third of the council was up for election and the Conservative party stayed in overall control of the council.

The Conservative party won all 15 seats up for election with no surprises in the results.

After the election, the composition of the council was:

Election result

Two Conservative candidates were unopposed.

Ward results

Ashingdon and Canewdon

Barling and Sutton

Foulness and Great Wakering

Hockley Central

Hockley North

Hocklet West

Hullbridge

Lodge

Rayleigh Central

Rochford

Sweyne Park

Trinity

Wheatley

Whitehouse

References

External links
2008 Rochford election result
Ward results

2008
2008 English local elections
2000s in Essex